The Battle of Vozuća was an attack by the 3rd Corps of the Army of the Republic of Bosnia and Herzegovina on 10 September 1995 against the strategically important village of Vozuća, in the municipality of Zavidovići during the Bosnian War. This area was held by rebel Bosnian Serb forces since 1992, which had committed war crimes against 21 Bosniak civilians.

The attack 

The attack itself, was carried out by the El Mudžahid Detachment of the 3rd Corps, they also were accompanied by some regular members of the ARBIH. The attack was planned already in May 1995 and had three phases which were carried out. The first one was called "Crveni lav" (Red Lion) and the main goal in this operation was to cut the communication of the VRS in Vozuća. They succeeded and pushed  the Serb forces. The second part of the operation was called "Battle for pride". The goal was to prepare refugees from Srebrenica and Žepa to move into the area after it was liberated. It was planned but after the attack, only a small group of people arrived at the destroyed Vozuća area.

Final phase 

Everything was ready and the final attack code named "Uragan". The attack started on 10 September and ended the same day with the total victory of the Bosnian forces. They used very good planning and were ahead of the Serb forces. The Army and the Mujahideen got help from a special military force called Black Swans. The Bosnian forces continued advancing through the Ozren area.

References

Further reading 

Bosnian War
Conflicts in 1995
1995 in Bosnia and Herzegovina
Battles of the Bosnian War
July 1995 events in Europe
August 1995 events in Europe
September 1995 events in Europe
Bosnian mujahideen